The medial surface of the labyrinth of ethmoid consists of a thin lamella, which descends from the under surface of the cribriform plate, and ends below in a free, convoluted margin, the middle nasal concha (middle nasal turbinate).

It is rough, and marked above by numerous grooves, directed nearly vertically downward from the cribriform plate; they lodge branches of the olfactory nerves, which are distributed to the mucous membrane covering the superior nasal concha.

Additional images

See also
 Nasal concha

References

External links
 
 
 upstate.edu - Frontal
  - lateral
  - coronal
 

Bones of the head and neck